The 2016–17 Premier League Cup is the fourth edition of the competition, and the first since it was renamed from the U21 Premier League Cup following the age limit being increased to under-23.

Participants

Category 1
Blackburn Rovers
Brighton & Hove Albion
Derby County
Everton
Fulham
Leicester City
Liverpool
Manchester City
Middlesbrough
Newcastle United
Norwich City
Reading
Southampton
Stoke City
Sunderland
Swansea City
West Bromwich Albion
West Ham United
Wolverhampton Wanderers

Category 2 
Barnsley
Birmingham City
Bristol City
Cardiff City
Charlton Athletic
Colchester United
Huddersfield Town
Hull City
Ipswich Town
Nottingham Forest
Sheffield United
Watford

Category 3 
AFC Bournemouth
Burnley
Portsmouth
Southend United
Wigan Athletic
AFC Wimbledon

Qualifying rounds
Two qualifying rounds were required to finalise the 32 teams that would enter the Group Stage. The First Qualifying Round consisted of the six EPPP Category 3 academy sides, with the three winners progressing to the next round.

In the Second Qualifying Round, the three winners were joined by Barnsley and Watford (the two teams who finished bottom of their respective Category 2 leagues in 2015/16). Of the five teams in the Second Qualifying Round draw, one received a bye straight to the Group Stage, with the two winners joining them.

First qualifying round

Second qualifying round

Group stage
The draw for the group stage took place on 6 September 2016. Teams play each other twice, with the group winners and runners–up advance to the round of 16.

Results

Group A

Group B

Group C

Group D

Group E

Group F

Group G

Group H

Knockout stages

Round of 16

Quarter–final

Semi–final

Final

 

 

|-
|colspan=4|Substitutes:
|-
 
 
 
 

|-
|colspan=4|Coach:  Cameron Toshack
|-

 
 

 

 
 

|-
|colspan=4|Substitutes:
|-

 
 

|-
|colspan=4|Coach:  Martin Kuhl
|-

See also
 2016–17 Professional U23 Development League
 2016–17 FA Youth Cup

References 

Premier League Cup (football)
Under-23